Noisy-le-Roi station (French: Gare de Noisy-le-Roi) is a railway station in the town Noisy-le-Roi, Yvelines department, northern France. It is on the western part of the Grande Ceinture line.

Until 6 July 2019, it was part of Transilien Line L, and became part of Île-de-France tramway Line 13 Express on 6 July 2022.

References

External links
 

Railway stations in Yvelines
Railway stations in France opened in 1882